GJS may refer to:
 GoJet Airlines, an American airline
 Greenwich Japanese School, in Connecticut
 Gjs, a JavaScript interpreter; see List of language bindings for GTK+